Vena, currently DNA Latin Group, is an American bachata group formed by members Lenny Santos and Max Santos from Aventura alongside ex-vocalist Steven Tejada from Xtreme. They are known for their hits such as "Sangre de Mis Venas", "Corazon de Hierro (featuring Teodoro Reyes & Frank Reyes)", "Señora", "Dile a El", "Por Mentiras", among others. VENA alongside Larry Hernandez were nominated for a Billboard Premious Musica Mexicana award in 2012.

Formation

From D'Element to VENA 
After the group Aventura announced their separation in 2011, Lenny and Max formed their new bachata group called "D'Element". They released their first single song called "You & Me".  Steven, ex-vocalist from bachata group Xtreme, went to Lenny as a client to work on music. Lenny produced a song for Steve called "Señora". After producing the song for Steve, he asked if he would like to join his new group D'Element. Steve accepted the offer. They renamed the group and formed VENA. They adapted the "Bachata Supergroup" concept as members from two former popular bachata groups merged into one. They released their first single "Señora" in 2011 and their second single "Ya No" in 2012. They both did well commercially and became top radio hits. Since then they have released countless top charting songs, such as "Corazon de Hierro (feat. Teodoro Reyes and Frank Reyes)", "Por Mentiras" among others. They released "It Wont Stop" featuring Aileen, a cover of Sevyn Streeter's "It Wont Stop (featuring Chris Brown)" in 2014, just before their latest hit single "Dile a El" was released in early December 2014. Due to problems with the group's manager, Steve left the group in 2015 to pursue a solo career. Max left the group to pursue and focus on his rap career which he was supposed to do back when Aventura first separated. Lenny released the group's final single "El Final" featuring Mike Stanley, which was written by ex-member Steve. Steve released his version of "El Final" as well.

From VENA to DNA Latin Group 
Lenny, alongside new talent J Love, released their first single "Lujuria" in 2018 under the group's new name DNA Latin Group. They released their second single "Hermanita". Max then re-joined the group and they released their third single "Soy Tu Delirio." Since then they have been working on new music, which is planned to be released in 2019. Ironically, Steve, who reunited with Xtreme, performed alongside former group DNA for a "Mega Bachaton" Reunion Tour.

Members

Principal Members 

 Julio Bello a.k.a. J Love - lead vocals, composer
 Lenny Santos – lead guitar, rhythm guitar, electric guitar, arranger, producer
 Max Santos – bass guitar

Former Members 

 Steven Tejada – lead vocals, songwriter
 Aileen Rosario – female vocals

Discography

Singles 
As D'Element

 You & Me (2011)
 Always (2011)
 Muere Un Hombre (2011)

As VENA 

 Señora (2011)
 Party Rock Anthem (Bachata & Merengue Mambo Cover) (2011)
 Ya No (2012) (Peaked # 10 in the Billboard Tropical Airplay chart) 
 Por Mentiras (2012)
 Sangre De Mis Venas (2012) (Peaked # 22 in the Billboard Tropical Airplay chart) 
 Corazon De Hierro (featuring Teodoro Reyes & Frank Reyes) (2013) (Peaked # 5 in the Billboard Tropical Airplay chart)
 It Won't Stop (Bachata Cover) (featuring Aileen) (2014)
 Dile A El (2014) (Peaked # 16 in the Billboard Tropical Airplay chart)
 Hotline Bling (Bachata Remix) (featuring L.O.S)
 El Final (featuring Mike Stanley) (2015)

As DNA Latin Group 

 Lujuria (2018)
 Hermanita (2018)
 Soy Tu Delirio (2018)

Live EP From Vena
 It's VENA (Live) (2015) (Peaked # 10 in the Billboard Tropical Albums chart)

References

External links 
 https://www.facebook.com/itsVENA/
 https://www.instagram.com/dnalatingroup/
 https://music.apple.com/us/artist/dna-latin-group/1356877667

Bachata music groups
Musical groups from the Bronx